Seeking Alpha is a crowd-sourced content service that publishes news on financial markets. It is accessible via a website and mobile app. After a free trial period, users must pay a subscription fee to access content. Independent contributors, mostly from the buy side, write almost all of the articles published by the service and are paid based on how many subscribers access their articles. Notable contributors include Henry Blodget and Paco Ahlgren.

Seeking Alpha was founded in 2004 by former Morgan Stanley technology analyst David Jackson.

The company established distribution partnerships with MSN, CNBC, MarketWatch, NASDAQ and TheStreet.com.

Results of recommendations (2005-2012)
In 2014, the Review of Financial Studies published Wisdom of Crowds: The Value of Stock Opinions Transmitted Through Social Media. Researchers from City University of Hong Kong, Purdue University and Georgia Institute of Technology analyzed approximately 100,000 Seeking Alpha articles and commentary published between 2005 and 2012. The researchers looked at the ability of Seeking Alpha articles to predict not only future stock returns (a variable susceptible to influence by analysts' published opinions), but also future earnings surprises (a variable unlikely to be influenced by published opinions). The authors found that views expressed in Seeking Alpha articles, as well as reader commentaries on those articles, did predict future stock returns over every time-frame examined, from one month to three years. Articles and reader commentaries also predicted earning surprises.

Awards and recognition
In 2007, Seeking Alpha was selected by Kiplinger's as Best Investment Informant.

In 2011, Seeking Alpha Market Currents was listed as number one in Inc.'s list of Essential Economic blogs.

In 2013, Wired named Seeking Alpha one of the "core nutrients of a good data diet."

Allegations of market manipulation
Seeking Alpha has been alleged to be a platform for market manipulators. Given Seeking Alpha's popularity, some investors take advantage of it to manipulate the market for their benefit. To do so, they typically post highly negative news or analysis about a company and their stock, urging the readers to sell their shares and not to buy any new shares, causing a rapid decline in the stock price by the readers rushing to sell their shares. They expect that this will create a lower entry point for them to buy the stock in the near future and they will profit once their biased and misrepresented article is rebutted. Some other investors will also short the stock before they post their negative article, profiting both by the initial decline of the stock price and its subsequent near-future rise by regaining its possession at a lower price.

See also
Alpha (finance)
Value Line
Security analysis
Securities research
Stock valuation
Financial analyst

References

External links 
 

Economics websites
Finance websites
Financial services companies established in 2004
Online publishing companies of the United States
Securities (finance)